Cheval may refer to:

Cheval, Florida, United States
Cheval tree, a tree native to North Agalega Island
Cheval mirror, a full-length floor-standing mirror mounted in a frame that allows it to swing freely
Cheval, loan word from French meaning horse meat

People with the surname
Christophe Cheval (born 1971), French sprinter
Ferdinand Cheval (1836–1924), French postman

See also 
 Chaval (disambiguation)